This is a list of flag bearers who have represented Saint Lucia at the Olympics.

Flag bearers carry the national flag of their country at the opening ceremony of the Olympic Games.

See also
Saint Lucia at the Olympics

References

Saint Lucia at the Olympics
Saint Lucia
Olympic flagbearers